Michael Eddy (born July 17, 1952 in Midland, Michigan) is a stock car auto racer.  He is most notable for racing in the now defunct American Speed Association (ASA).  He was a seven time ASA National Champion, which is the most in ASA history.  During his run in ASA Eddy drove the number 88 car.

ASA
Eddy won his seven championships in 1974, 1976, 1981, 1982, 1989, 1991, and 1992.  In addition to this he was ASA's all-time career leader in laps lead, starts, and top 10s. Eddy also ranks second in all-time victories with 58 and second on the all-time earnings list.  During his championship season of 1992 he led 2,183 laps that year, which was a single-season record. Eddy recorded his 58th victory on June 12, 2004 at the Berlin Raceway in Marne, Michigan after a two-year absence from auto racing. Eddy was known to be an aggressive driver who wasn't shy about nudging slower cars out of his way.

Offers from NASCAR teams
Because of the success that he had achieved in ASA, Eddy received several offers from NASCAR teams, turning them down each time. In the early 1990s, he was offered the No. 75 car by RahMoc Enterprises, which was a prominent Winston Cup Series ride at the time. He turned it down because his GM Goodwrench deal in ASA came along at the same time.

A few years later, Eddy was offered to drive the No. 43 truck for Petty Enterprises for the 1996 Craftsman Truck Series season, but once again had to turn down the offer due to his contract with GM Goodwrench at the time.

Personal
Eddy has a wife named Patsy.

Awards
Eddy was inducted into the Michigan Motor Sports Hall of Fame in 1995.

References

External links
The Third Turn Profile
Ultimate Racing History Profile
Profile from Racingone.com
Eddy Back in Victory Lane Article

Living people
1952 births
People from Midland, Michigan
Racing drivers from Michigan
American Speed Association drivers